Deepdale  is a locality east of Geraldton, Western Australia. Its local government area is the City of Greater Geraldton.

The locality was gazetted in 1985.

Geography
The locality is bounded on the west by Polo Road and on the east by Deepdale Road.

References

Suburbs of Geraldton